Aglaia stellatopilosa is a tree in the family Meliaceae. The bark is greyish green. The specific epithet  is from the Latin meaning "stellate hairs", referring to those on the twigs. Habitat is forests from sea-level to  altitude. A. stellatopilosa is endemic to Borneo.

References

stellatopilosa
Plants described in 2004
Endemic flora of Borneo
Trees of Borneo
Flora of the Borneo lowland rain forests